Max Eider (real name, Peter Millson) is an English guitarist and songwriter.

He studied English literature at University College, Oxford, graduating in Trinity Term 1980.<ref>'Oxford University Calendar, 1980-81.</ref>  He played guitar with Pat Fish (The Jazz Butcher) from June 1982 until 27 November 1986, when after an alcohol-fuelled altercation with Fish, he left the band.  He went on to record a solo album, The Best Kisser in the World, which mixes up-temp indie pop numbers ("Let Somebody Down" and "Quiet Lives") with songs in a moodier, jazz-influenced style.  He also played on recordings by others, including Songs from Another Season by David J.

He rejoined the Jazz Butcher for what was billed as the last ever Jazz Butcher gig on 21 December 1995, and has performed and recorded with Fish since, on the live album Glorious and Idiotic (2000) and the studio album Rotten Soul.  2002 saw the release of a second solo album, Hotel Figueroa, and a third, Max Eider III, appeared in 2007.

In 2010 Eider released his fourth solo album Disaffection on Tundraducks Records.

Solo discography
 The Best Kisser in the World (1987, Big Time)
 Hotel Figueroa (2002, Vinyl Japan)
 Back In The Bedroom (2007, Tundraducks Records)
 Disaffection (2010, Tundraducks Records)
 Duckdance'' (2014, Tundraduck Records)

References

External links
Official website

English pop guitarists
English rock guitarists
English male guitarists
Living people
Year of birth missing (living people)